Castanea may refer to:

 Castanea (plant), a plant genus including the chestnuts and chinkapins
 Castanea (Thessaly), an ancient city of Thessaly, Greece
 Castanea, Pennsylvania, a census-designated place (CDP)
 Castanea Township, Pennsylvania, which surrounds the CDP of the same name
 Castanea (journal), the professional journal of the Southern Appalachian Botanical Club
 Castanea delle Furie, a city near Messina, Italy

See also